Send tape echo echo delay (more commonly known as STEED, alternatively known as single tape echo and echo delay) is a technique used in magnetic tape sound recording to apply a delay effect using tape loops and echo chambers.

In 2006, while publicising his memoir (Here, There, and Everywhere: My Life Recording the Music of The Beatles), recording engineer Geoff Emerick stated that "God only knows" how the effect worked.

Technique 

The technique was developed at EMI/Abbey Road Studios in the late 1950s, by EMI engineer Gwynne Stock. It involved delaying the recorded (dry) signal, sending it into the studio's echo chamber using a tape machine.  The dry signal (without delay) was also sent to the chamber via the tape machine's replay head.  The resulting sound was picked up by two condenser microphones.  These microphones then fed the wet signal back to the recording console. The amount of feedback could be controlled allowing multiple delays to be sent to the reverb chamber, which could lengthen the effect's decay time.

An identical technique was used for the production of Anthology 1 in 1995, where speakers were used to play the sound within the echo chamber.

Use 
One notable example of the use of STEED is on George Harrison's lead vocal on "Everybody's Trying to Be My Baby" (1964). Mark Lewisohn describes the effect as a "vast amount", and likened Harrison's vocal to singing inside a tin can.  He notes that some of the musical backing tracks were also affected by the technique due to microphone spill from Harrison's headphones. Other examples of the use of STEED on Beatles recordings include the vocal fermata in "Paperback Writer" (1966), and Paul McCartney's piano on "Birthday" (1968).

The effect was also used on "Revolution 9" (1968), and was used in the mixing of tracks for Anthology 1 in 1995.

See also 
 Artificial double tracking, a technique developed by EMI/Abbey Road's Ken Townsend

Footnotes

Sources 

 
 
 
 
 
 
 
 

Audio effects
The Beatles music